KJI or kji may refer to:

 IATA code for Kanas Airport, China
 Zabana language (ISO 639-3 code)